Brown Range or Sørtindane Peaks is a group of seven peaks in the Framnes Mountains about  south of Mount Twintop in Mac. Robertson Land, Antarctica.

References

	

mountain ranges of Mac. Robertson Land